The Pacific Northwest PGA Championship is a golf tournament that is the championship of the Pacific Northwest section of the PGA of America, which includes Oregon, Washington, northern Idaho, western Montana, and Alaska. The tournament began  in 1934 and has been played annually.

Jeff Coston, who played on the PGA Tour in the 1980s, holds the record with seven Pacific Northwest PGA victories from 1997 to 2010.  PGA Tour winners who have also won the Pacific Northwest PGA Championship include Ed "Porky" Oliver (eight-time PGA tour winner), Charles Congdon (two-time PGA tour winner), Pat Fitzsimons, and Don Bies.

Winners

^ Prior to 1999, Sahalee Country Club (1972, 1974) was in unincorporated King County, with a Redmond address.

References

External links
PGA of America – Pacific Northwest section
Past Champions/PNW PGA Professional Championship (PPC)

Golf in Washington (state)
Golf in Oregon
Golf in Montana
Golf in Idaho
PGA of America sectional tournaments
Recurring sporting events established in 1934
1934 establishments in Washington (state)